Retinol binding protein 7 is a protein that in humans is encoded by the RBP7 gene.

Function

The protein encoded by this gene is a member of the cellular retinol-binding protein (CRBP) family, whose members are required for vitamin A stability and metabolism. The encoded protein binds all-trans-retinol and is structurally similar to other CRBPs; however, it has a lower binding affinity for retinol than other CRBPs. [provided by RefSeq, Aug 2016].

References

External links 
 PDBe-KB provides an overview of all the structure information available in the PDB for Human Retinoid-binding protein 7

Further reading